All Girls is the debut novel by Emily Layden.

Plot
Atwater, an all-girls boarding school in Connecticut, deals with a sexual assault lawsuit from an alumna who was raped by a teacher two decades ago.

References

Debut novels
English-language novels
2021 novels